Fusiturricula maesae is a species of sea snail, a marine gastropod mollusk in the family Drilliidae.

The specific name maesae is named in honor of American malacologist Virginia Orr Maes.

Distribution
The type locality is in the demersal zone off Rio de Janeiro to São Paulo, Brazil. at a depth of 91 m.

Description 
The maximum recorded shell length is 54 mm.

Habitat 
Minimum recorded depth is 91 m. Maximum recorded depth is 91 m.

References

  Tucker, J.K. 2004 Catalog of recent and fossil turrids (Mollusca: Gastropoda). Zootaxa 682:1-1295

External links
 

maesae
Gastropods described in 1985